Kettle Cove is a small community located on the southern island of Twillingate, Newfoundland and Labrador.

Populated places in Newfoundland and Labrador